Mikhail Vasilyevich Afonin (born 25 June 1957) is a Russian professional football coach.

External links
  Career summary at Footballfacts

1957 births
Living people
Russian football managers
FC Nizhny Novgorod managers